Clifton Sandvliet (born August 18, 1977) is a Surinamese retired professional footballer. He played for SV Transvaal, Walking Boys Company and the National Army. Sandvliet won three top scorer standings of the league SVB.

His record with the national football team of Suriname is 30 caps and 9 goals.

Club career
For all of his three clubs; Sportvereniging Nationaal Leger, SV Transvaal and Walking Boys Company he has scored a massive 94 goals. He has played senior first-team club football since 2000.

International career
Sandvliet played from 2000 until 2008 for the Surinamese football team. After a brief interruption from 2006, he returned to the team on June 14, 2008 during the World Cup qualifying match against Guyana. In this game he made the only goal.

Player statistics

Honours and awards

Club (4)
 Walking Boys Company
Hoofdklasse: 2005/06, 2008/09
Suriname President's Cup: 2006, 2009
Beker van Suriname: 2004 (Runner up)

Individual (12 awards)
Hoofdklasse Top Scorer (2): 2001/2002, 2005/06
Top scorer of Suriname: 9 Goals
Most caps of Suriname: 30 Caps
Hoofdklasse Best player (2): 2005, 2006
Hoofdklasse Golden Shoe (5): 2002, 2003, 2004, 2005, 2006
All-Time Scorers in Hoofdklasse since 1999 (unofficial data)

References

External links
 
 

Living people
1977 births
Sportspeople from Paramaribo
Surinamese footballers
Suriname international footballers
Sportvereniging Nationaal Leger players
S.V. Transvaal players
S.V. Walking Boyz Company players
SVB Eerste Divisie players
Association football midfielders